Scott Steel (born 20 April 1999) is an English cricketer. He made his List A debut on 17 April 2019, for Durham County Cricket Club in the 2019 Royal London One-Day Cup. He made his T20 debut on 19 July 2019, for Durham against Northamptonshire, in the 2019 t20 Blast. He made his first-class debut on 10 September 2019, for Durham in the 2019 County Championship. Steel left Durham at the end of the 2020 season, and joined Leicestershire in October 2020.

References

External links
 

1999 births
Living people
English cricketers
Durham cricketers
Leicestershire cricketers
Sportspeople from Durham, England
Cricketers from County Durham